The women's VL2 competition at the 2021 ICF Canoe Sprint World Championships in Copenhagen took place on Lake Bagsværd.

Schedule
The schedule was as follows:

All times are Central European Summer Time (UTC+2)

Results
With fewer than ten competitors entered, this event was held as a direct final.

References

ICF
ICF